John Milton Stephens (February 23, 1966 – September 1, 2009) was an American professional football player who was a running back in the National Football League (NFL). He was selected by the New England Patriots in the first round (17th overall) of the 1988 NFL Draft. At 6 feet 1 inch and 215 pounds, he was a running back from Northwestern State University in Louisiana. Stephens played in six NFL seasons from 1988 to 1993 for the Patriots, the Green Bay Packers and the Kansas City Chiefs. As a rookie for the Patriots during the 1988 NFL season, Stephens rushed for 1,168 yards and was selected to his only Pro Bowl. 

Stephens was married to All-American college swimmer Sybil Smith. Their daughter Sloane Stephens, born in 1993, is a professional tennis player who won the 2017 US Open women's singles title. Their son John Stephens Jr. played football at Texas Christian University.

Stephens was twice charged with rape. In 1994, during his final NFL season, he was accused of raping a woman at a Kansas City hotel. He pleaded guilty and was sentenced to probation. Then, in May 2009, he was arrested in Caddo Parish, Louisiana and charged with forcible rape of a 51-year-old woman. That charge was still pending when Stephens was killed in a car accident in Keithville, Louisiana on September 1, 2009.

NFL career statistics

References

1966 births
2009 deaths
Players of American football from Shreveport, Louisiana
American football running backs
Northwestern State Demons football players
New England Patriots players
Green Bay Packers players
Atlanta Falcons players
Kansas City Chiefs players
American Conference Pro Bowl players
National Football League Offensive Rookie of the Year Award winners
Road incident deaths in Louisiana
American people convicted of rape